Gutalagen is an early Swedish (or Gutnish) law book from Gotland that officially was in use until 1595, but in practice until 1645. The law book originated in about 1220 and, apart from laws, it also contains the Gutasaga.

External links 
Gutalagen (in Swedish)

Gotland
Law books
13th-century books
Legal history of Sweden